The Brood are a fictional race of insectoid, parasitic, extraterrestrial beings appearing in American comic books published by Marvel Comics, especially Uncanny X-Men. Created by writer Chris Claremont and artist Dave Cockrum, they first appeared in The Uncanny X-Men #155 (March 1982).

Concept and creation
According to Dave Cockrum, the Brood were originally conceived to serve as generic subordinates for the main villain of The Uncanny X-Men #155: "We had Deathbird in this particular story and Chris [Claremont] had written into the plot 'miscellaneous alien henchmen.' So I had drawn Deathbird standing in this building under construction and I just drew the most horrible looking thing I could think of next to her."

Biology

Physical characteristics
The Brood are an alien race of insectoid beings. They are a specialized race, one that has evolved to reproduce and consume any available resources. They are sadistic creatures that enjoy the suffering they intentionally cause others, especially the terror their infection causes their hosts. They have been compared to "demons".

Despite their resemblance to insects, the Brood have endoskeletons as well as exoskeletons. Also unlike insects, they have fanged jaws instead of mandibles. Their skulls are triangular and flat, with a birthmark (such as the battle axe which is most common in broodlings but are different for each Brood) between their large eyes. Their two front legs are actually long tentacles they can use to manipulate objects.

Due to their natural body armor and teeth, the Brood are very dangerous in combat. In addition, they have stingers that can deliver either paralyzing or killing poison.

Reproduction
The parasitic Brood reproduce asexually and therefore have no clear divisions of gender. They reproduce by forcibly implanting their eggs into other sentient organism. Each host can only support one egg. Upon hatching, the host dies as the Brood egg releases enzymes into the bloodstream to cause mutation. At the same time, the Broodling begins to psychically attack its host, taking control of its mind, absorbing its genetic material and incorporating all its knowledge and memories into the Brood. They appear to be capable of even infecting demons or someone who is possessed by a demon like Ghost Rider.

They use a hive mind to pass memory to their hosts, which also passes an individual's knowledge, given to a broodling, to the hive and back to the queen, meaning newborn brood know what any member of the race knows. Until the embryo gains the host's body the embryo can only gain temporary control of the host, often without the host noticing as the host is unaware when it loses control.

If the host possesses any genetic powers, the resultant Brood will inherit them. The persona of the host once the Brood is "born" appears to be extinguished, but in some cases, the host's will may be strong enough to survive and coexist with the Brood's. However it is implied that hosts with advanced healing ability are unable to turn, for example when an egg was implanted in Deadpool, instead of turning into a Brood, a small Brood burst out of Deadpool's body.

Brood also have the ability to morph into their host's original form, and a hybrid form with characteristics of both the host and the Brood body.

More recently the Brood had demonstrate the abily to use their hosts as pregnancy carriers instead of to physically transform them.

Civilization
The Brood have a civilization based on the typical communal insect societies, such as those of the bees and ants. The Empress is the absolute ruler, while the Queens lead individual Brood colonies and the "sleazoids" do all the work; despite their evil, they never rebel against their Queens, perhaps due to the latter's telepathic abilities. However, the Queens have no allegiance to each other. Some of the roles have proven to be flexible.

 Empress - The Empress is the top tier of the Brood caste system and exercises almost total control over her progeny, including determining which Brood become Queen and which remain Warrior-Prime. There is only one Brood Empress at a time, and she is massive. She shares several physical characteristics with her offspring. She has large yellow eyes, a scaly brown hide, and a mouth full of razor-sharp teeth. However, she possesses several physical traits that distinguish her from all other Brood. While Warriors-Prime have forked skulls, the Brood Empress has two scarlet horns protruding from the top of her head, with an armor plate at their base. She also has eight whiskers, seemingly unique to her physiology. Jagged spikes protrude from every part of her body. In addition to being larger than her offspring, she also has a large ovipositor through which she lays eggs. Her relative size and degree of mobility are unknown. However, she possesses vast telepathic powers, through which she shares a mind-link with the entire Brood hive, although she cannot completely control the actions of her subordinates. When individual Brood rebel, she cannot telepathically force them to assimilate. In these scenarios, she has the renegade offspring destroyed with the help of her assassins/personal guard, the Firstborn. The Empress was one of the casualties of the Annihilation Wave which left the Brood's on the brink of extinction and with her death one of the survivor Brood Queens was selected to take her place among the hierarchy as a Brood Queen is seen among the Galactic Council, where she represents the entire Brood race and even goes by the name of Queen of the Brood.
 Firstborn - Considered themselves as the "pure" Brood, they are the most trusted agents of the Empress, existing solely to attack and destroy. The Empress births them herself and dispatches them to quell rebellious Brood Queens and other conflicts that require only fighters. Because they are not born of hosts, they do not possess the Warrior-Prime ability to conceal their appearance by shifting into their host-forms. For this reason, they are used not to subvert and infect, but merely to destroy. The transportation they use to travel to other planets dissolves upon reaching its destination, but this poses no problem, as the Firstborn are ordered to execute themselves upon completing their missions. The Firstborn are larger than common Brood Warriors-Prime, and green instead of brown. They have six limbs: two sets of arms and one set of legs. They have a spear-tipped, prehensile tail, but unlike their Warrior-Prime sisters, they have no tentacles. They also have durable, spiked armor plating on their shoulders, fingertips, tails, elbows, forearms, knees, and, most prominently, on the crowns of their heads. They are extremely durable, disproportionately agile, and immensely strong. Unlike the Warriors-Prime, they do not have wings. However, through some other means, possibly technological, the Firstborn have the ability to teleport. Their teleportation abilities are likely restricted to relatively short distances, as the Firstborn travel over interstellar distances using other methods.
 Brood Queens - Also known as Great Mothers, Mother-Queens and Brood Imperiatrix, the Queens fulfill the mental command of the Empress, a unique alien who houses the hive mind. Queens can communicate with their spawn by telepathy, even across interstellar distances. They look like the Broodlings but slightly larger. Their heads and thoraxes are relatively the same size, and they have the same amount of limbs as their offspring, but their abdomens are much larger, presumably because they require the capacity to carry eggs. The Queen's tail functions as a venom-filled stinger, not an ovipositor. The Queens are capable of implanting eggs, which can be of the Warrior-Prime or Queen variety, into hosts for the Brood Hive. Sometimes, the Queen can also lay a King egg variety, but this is rarer. The Brood Queens lead individual Brood colonies, which usually encompass entire planets, they also control which of their offspring become Warriors-Prime, and which become new Queens. For example, the Great Mother from Sleazeworld implanted the Shi’ar warrior Fang with a Warrior-Prime embryo, but implanted the rest of the X-Men with Queen embryos, a discrepancy that suggests a certain amount of control on the Queen's end.
 Dwarf Brood Queen - Are Queens that due to their size and strength are raised among the bottom level of the Brood. When the Empress dies, both types of Queens can take the place of the Empress, but for such a feat, a ritual must be done which consist of finding the perfect mate and breed with him in order to produce the Firstborns.
 Broodlings - As the bottom level of the Brood caste system, the Broodlings were nicknamed "sleazoids" by Kitty Pryde but are also known as Warriors-Prime or Drones, they are the most common of the Brood. They do all the labor and most of the fighting, and are organized into several different roles, among them Weaponeer, Clan-Master, Hunt-Master, Huntsmen, Tech Handlers, and Scholars. They resemble large insects and can vary in size. They generally retain the size of their hosts. Their hides are brown and covered in armored scales. Their bodies consist of three sections: a head, a thorax, and an abdomen. The forked crowns of their heads extend backward, well over the length of the thorax. Each Brood has a unique black figure on its forehead, almost like a birthmark or a fingerprint. They have large, yellow eyes on both sides of their heads, large mouths, and one row of spiky teeth on the top and bottom of the jaw. Each Brood has six limbs; two tentacles that function as forearms and two rear sets of jointed limbs. Their tentacles are dexterous enough to fire weapons and pilot ships. The Brood Warriors-Prime also have wings and fly as a primary means of travel. Their abdomens taper into a two-pronged, functional stinger. The most common method of creating a Brood is through infection of a host, and this is how all Warriors-Prime are birthed. The Brood lays its eggs at the back of the necks of its victims since everything the eggs need to gestate, including all 31 nerve segments and access to the carotid and vertebral arteries, rests at the top of the spinal column. After a Queen implants her eggs into a host, the egg splices itself to the host's nervous system and rewrites its DNA into that of Brood. Upon the egg's hatching, the host undergoes transformation into a Brood Warrior-Prime. The Warrior-Prime retains the genetic memory of its host, enabling it to access the host's personality, access any of the abilities contained in the host's genetic code, and even revert to its host body when it needs to conceal itself. It can also use a transitional form between the Brood and the host, giving it access to the best abilities from each form.
 Brood King - This unique male Brood is a rarity and even considered a mutation in the Brood society and is created when a King egg is implanted in its host. He is the antithesis of the Brood Empress. The first known Brood King was Grand Admiral Devros of the Kree who was willingly infected by the Brood. Unlike those infected with Queen's or Drone's eggs, the Brood King cannot infect others and only suffers a slight transformation (the skin becomes scaly, the eyes enlarge and the mouth becomes full of razor-sharp teeth) and maintains much of its original personality. It's assumed that like the Empress there is only one Brood King at a time; when Devros was killed by Mar-Vell, who himself had been infect by the Queen, Mar-Vell briefly proclaimed himself the new "Brood King", but the egg was destroyed before it could fully claim him. It was later implied that the King-type egg is actually a natural response of the Brood to the experiments done 8000 years ago by the Black Judges, a secret science wing of the Kree Accusers. Understanding the Brood's volatile nature, they forcibly implanted them with a patriarchal element through a genetic engineering device which, when active, can disrupt the species' matriarchy, take control of them, and use them as weapons to disrupt rival advanced civilizations. The device is an egg-shaped artifact which must always be protected by a containment shield and under no circumstances should the device be removed from it, because inside it lays the potential for whoever controls the item to become the dominant member of the species, giving them control over the legions of Brood that exist in the universe. This leads every Brood Queen to send their swarms in pursuit of it, to prevent any loss of their power in the Brood hive-mind. The device was eventually cracked open and eaten by Broo, a young mutant Brood drone that developed intelligence and independent thought. The properties of the egg were then transferred to Broo, giving him inherent authority over every Brood hive in existence, at least for the next 5 to 10 Kree cycles before the effects wear off.

Technology 
The Brood, like most alien species, possess advanced technology, however due to their nature it's unknown if they developed it themselves or assimilated it for their own benefit. These include:
 Interstellar warships: despite using the Acanti, the Brood also use actual ships, however with a mixture of organic and inorganic material.
 Energy-based weapons
 Psi-scream weapons: gun-like devices that attacks the minds of targets with subconscious fears and hatreds.
 Inhibitor field: used to prevent telepaths from using their powers.
 Nanotechnology
 Teleportation

Fictional species biography

The Brood are the Main Universe's first natural predators, spawned on a dark galaxy prior the emergence of Galactus from his incubator. Their planet of origin is unknown, but such is their relentless evil, legend holds that the Brood originated not through natural evolution, but in otherworldly sorcery from a different universe from which they escaped, with hopes of satisfying their insatiable hunger after its collapsing. They were eventually found and captured by the Kree Empire, along with other hive species, so they could weaponize them and use them against rival empires. The Supreme Intelligence approved of the idea, stating that they could be used against the Shi'ar Empire, although, he sees that it'll take millions of years to create a large enough army to fully be unleashed as a weapon against their enemies.

In the next eight million years of experimentation the Black Judges deemed the Brood a major success and were unleashed on the Shi'ar Galaxy where the Brood found certain large space-dwelling creatures that they decided to prey to use as living starships to infest neighboring star systems and initiating an intergalactic campaign to build a fearsome empire. These space-dwelling creatures included the whale-like Acanti, and the shark-like Starsharks.

The Brood use a virus that effectively lobotomizes these creatures, the Slaver Virus as it is known is a powerful force that dismantles the cores of reasoning within the target's brain causing the sources of self-awareness and the conscious mind to simple shut down, turning the creatures into faithful zombies. Then they use bionics to control them. The Brood hollow out part of the creatures (by eating them) and use the space created to live in, like termites eating a tree. This eventually kills the living ships, requiring them to capture new ones. One of the Acanti they captured was of unusual size (its rib cage alone was the size of a mountain range.) They used it as their main base, and, when it died and crashed onto a planet, used it as their main city. The corpse was so large, it took centuries just to rot halfway. However, predators from the planet they landed on infested the area of the dead Acanti's brain, so the Brood avoided it.

Years later, Kree warrior Mar-Vell, has been ordered to make contact with the stranded Grand Admiral Devros on a planet in the Absolom Sector, a region known to be infested with Brood, Mar-Vell's team, which includes the medic Una and Colonel Yon-Rogg, was ambushed by Brood warriors after landing on the planet and taken prisoner by the Brood-infected Devros. The colony's Brood Queen impregnates each captive with Brood embryos, but Mar-Vell and Una manage to escape, destroy both leaders of the Brood colony, and ridding themselves of their infections using Una's modified omni-wave projector which had been designed to eliminate Brood embryos. After rescuing Colonel Yon-Rogg, the trio escape the planet and are rescued by the Shi'ar royal Deathbird.

Deathbird later allies with The Brood to gain their help deposing her sister Lilandra as ruler of their empire. As a reward for their help, Deathbird gives the Brood Lilandra, the X-Men, and the powerless Carol Danvers, along with Fang of the Imperial Guard, to use as hosts. The Brood infect the entire party, except for Danvers, who they perform experiments on because of her half-human/half-Kree genes. Wolverine's adamantium skeleton allowed his healing ability to purge him of the embryo, and he helps the others escape. He is unable to save Fang, who becomes a Brood warrior before they leave.

The Brood Queen orders her forces to find them, until she is contacted by the Queen embryo that is implanted in Cyclops. It explains that the X-Men are returning to Broodworld. Resigned to their dooms, the heroes help the Acanti race recover the racial Soul, a supernatural force that must be passed from one Acanti leader ("The Prophet-Singer") to the next. The Soul is located in a crystalline part of the dead Acanti Prophet-Singer's brain.

The Queen goes with her minions, and battles the X-Men, turning them into Brood warriors. The Prophet-Singer Soul is almost infected by the evil of the aliens, and Wolverine tries to mercy-kill his friends and the Queen but they are saved when Danvers, now a mighty being called Binary (due to experimentation), arrives and releases the Soul. Before it goes to its next host, the racial Soul cures the X-Men and Lilandra, and turns the Queen into a crystal statue. It also causes the Broodworld to explode, but the X-Men and their allies escape. Some of the Brood also manage to escape before the planet explodes. The new Prophet-Singer then leads the Acanti to safety in deep space. Returning to Earth with the Starjammers, the X-Men defeat and detain the Brood Queen infecting Charles Xavier in the first Earth-based confrontation with the Brood.  The advanced medical facilities at the Starjammers' disposal are able to transfer the consciousness of Xavier from the Brood Queen's body to a new cloned body, enabling Xavier to walk again.

A Brood-filled starshark later crashes on Earth, leading to the infection of several nearby humans by the Brood. One of the victims is allowed to live as a human assistant, but when he leads the aliens to some mutants, the Brood infect him and the mutants as well. It is revealed that the Brood can morph into the host's form or a hybrid of the two forms. In the course of the battle, an Earth woman named Hannah Connover is infected with a queen, though this problem would not develop until later.

Another branch of the Brood manage to land on Earth and infect more mutants, along with the Louisiana Assassins Guild of which X-Man Gambit is a member. The X-Men kill most of the infected people. They and Ghost Rider manage to rescue many of the Brood's other uninfected prisoners, only to have the "Spirit of Vengeance" become infected himself. Psylocke manages to separate Ghost Rider from the Brood host before it could kill Danny Ketch, the current host of the Ghost Rider, and he and the X-Men saved New Orleans.

Hannah Connover, previously infected with a Queen, soon begins to demonstrate attributes of Brood. She uses her new-found "healing" powers to become a faith healer and cure many people with her reverend husband, but secretly her Brood nature causes her to infect many people with embryos. Across the Galaxy, on the "true" Brood Homeworld, the Brood Empress sends her "firstborn" Imperial Assassins to kill Hannah for going against the Empress' wishes. Unable to stop future waves of Assassins from coming, the X-Man, Iceman, freezes Connover, putting her in suspended animation and causing the current firstborn to kill themselves, as in their minds the mission was accomplished. Connover is assumed to still be in suspended animation with her Queen host in the custody of the X-Men.

During the Contest of Champions II, the Brood with the help of the Badoon abduct several heroes and pose as a benevolent species willing to give the heroes access to advanced technology after competing against each other in a series of contests. However, in reality, the Brood intend to use Rogue, infested with a Brood Queen, to absorb the powers of the contest winners and become unstoppable. Fortunately, Iron Man realizes that the Brood are drugging food to amplify aggression- relying on his armor's own life-support systems to prevent him succumbing to the 'infection'- and is able to uncover the plot.

Although the Queen had already absorbed the powers and skills of the various contest winners- in the form of Captain America, Thor, the Hulk, Spider-Man, Jean Grey and the Scarlet Witch-, the remaining heroes managed to defeat her. The Brood Queen was extracted from Rogue with the aid of Carol Danvers, who forced the Brood Queen to flee by threatening to kill Rogue. After confirming that Rogue was cured, the heroes returned home.

A mixed team of X-Men and Fantastic Four was formed to investigate what happened to the NASA space station Simulacra, only to discover that it had been taken over by the Brood scouting party, leading the way to Earth for the Brood armies. After battling them, they left the station leaving the infected crew members alive despite the desires of Wolverine and Emma Frost to kill them due to the interference of the Invisible Woman. Soon a Brood invasion arrived at New York City. The X-Men and Fantastic Four defended the city from the Brood despite facing overwhelming odds. Using an enhanced Cerebro, Emma Frost projected a telepathic hallucination of the Phoenix and Galactus appearing in the city, which caused the Brood to panic and recall their forces to the dozens of Acanti ships after which they fled Earth.

It was also revealed that at some point in the dawn of civilization during the year 2610 BC, a spaceship filled with Brood crash landed in Egypt, marking the end of the second great dynasty due to the massive damage they've done. They went as far as turning a Pharaoh into one of their own and it also would have been the very end of days if not for Imhotep and a group of soldiers, among them En Sabah Nur, who were able to successfully fend off the invasion. Imhotep himself killed the Queen.

The Brood return to Earth in the Ms. Marvel series and battle Carol Danvers, who as Binary played a key role in their earlier defeat. Strangely enough, none of the Brood present recognize who she is, possibly because of her inability to fully access her cosmic powers, which also changed her physical appearance. The Brood are also stalked and summarily exterminated by the alien hunter called Cru, with whom Ms. Marvel also came into violent contact.

It later turned out that there had been escape pods from the Acanti, and the other one had the Brood Queen who had landed on Moster Island. Cru itself was back on Earth, having regenerated and was searching the Brood Queen. Ms. Marvel, seeing her as a threat, fought Cru again and in the process merged part of their minds temporarily making them unable to use their powers and therefore vulnerable to the Brood. The Brood Queen had established a nest on the island and infected the Moloids with their eggs. Ms. Marvel then discovered that the Brood Queen who ruled over the Brood of Sleazeworld had survived and now had a crystalline form. Upon arriving on the island, Operation: Lightning Storm strike team and Wonder Man battled the Brood, while Cru and Ms. Marvel having regained the ability to use their powers fought the Brood Queen. In the process Cru was killed, after which the Brood Queen was taken into space by Ms. Marvel who destroyed her with a nuclear weapon.

During the invasion of Annihilus and his Annihilation Wave, the Brood were decimated, and the species is now on the brink of extinction.

Some Brood appear in the arena of planet Saakar in the Planet Hulk storyline of The Incredible Hulk, one of them even becoming a main character. A Brood referred to as "No-Name", who becomes a genetic queen because their race is becoming rarer, becomes the lover of insect king Miek and also appears in World War Hulk. When it is discovered that Miek was the one who let the Hulk's shuttle explode, No-Name and Hulk attack Miek. Near the end of the War the "Earth Hive", the shared consciousness of every insect on Earth, use Humbug as a Trojan Horse to deal a crippling blow to No-Name, rendering her infertile and poisoning the last generation of hivelings, growing in Humbug's body. No-Name is a rarity among the Brood, as she learned to feel compassion for other living beings.

The Brood reappeared once again in the pages of Astonishing X-Men, however these Brood are revealed to be actual genetically grown hybrids created by a geneticist known only as Kaga who started growing and redesigning them with missing data about post M-Day work on Henry McCoy's research computers.

In the 2011 "Meanwhile" storyline Astonishing X-Men, S.W.O.R.D. scientists successfully find a way to remove a Brood embryo from a human host, but not before the Brood they are studying escape and attack, prompting a botched rescue mission led by Abigail Brand and another rescue mission led by the X-Men.

Given the chance to lower the Brood's numbers further, they discovered that the Annihilation event had caused the interstellar ecosystem to destabilize, since the Brood, dangerous as they are, served as natural predators for even worse species. These remaining species are now breeding out of control and present a greater threat than the Brood ever did. With no other choice, the X-Men act to prevent the Brood extinction. According to Bishop, there would be a race of benevolent Brood in the future, prompting the X-Men to willingly serve as Brood hosts, so that they could instill them with the same compassion felt by No-Name. After being connected with the hive-mind, the X-Men learned of a nearby Brood who was born with the ability to feel compassion, making him the Brood equivalent of a mutant. While such Brood are typically destroyed upon hatching by their kind, this one was permitted to live due to the Brood's dwindling numbers. After rescuing the Brood mutant and defeating the Brood in battle and allowing them to escape, the X-Men had their Brood embryos removed, to be raised aboard the Peak, with the Brood mutant acting as their mentor.

The 2012 X-Men subseries Wolverine and the X-Men featured a Broodling as a student at Wolverine's Jean Grey School for Higher Learning. Nicknamed "Broo" by Oya, the Broodling was a mutant, and both intelligent and non-violent able to wear clothing and glasses (which he felt made him look less frightening). Broo expressed a desire to join the Nova Corps. In a possible future timeline seen by Deathlok, Broo was a member of the X-Men alongside Oya, Quentin Quire, and Kid Gladiator.

During the Age of Ultron storyline, it is revealed that while in a hidden S.H.I.E.L.D. substation decades in the past, the future-Wolverine released and was infected by a less menacing Brood. When he cut the embryo out of his body, the Brood Collective responded to the attack by altering the physical structure of all future Brood to the form it is now known for.

During the Infinity storyline, a Brood Queen appeared as a member of the Galactic Council where she represents the Brood race, which indicates that the Brood Empress was apparently one of the casualties of the Annihilation Wave. She later made a deal with J'son, the former Emperor of the Spartoi Empire which consisted in J'son surrendered the planet Spartax to the Brood, and in exchange, J'son would acquire one planet for every ten worlds they conquered ever since.

In Spider-Man and the X-Men, the Brood made a pact with the Symbiotes but ended up being betrayed and possessed until Spider-Man, with the help of the X-Men and S.W.O.R.D managed to defeat them.

During The Black Vortex storyline, the deal between the Brood Queen and J'son is discover as the Brood began their takeover of Spartax and use the entire planet as hosts. The plot is foiled once Kitty Pryde is cosmically powered by The Black Vortex and banishes the Brood from the planet.

Later the Galactic Council manipulated Thanos into attacking the Earth so he could make way for them to raze the planet, the Queen of the Brood was killed by Angela before she and the other leaders of the Galactic Council could begin their attack.

Dario Agger and Roxxon Energy Corporation managed to obtain some Brood. Using some parasites on some wolves, Agger and one of his scientists sent them to track down Weapon H. When Weapon H slayed them, Dario Agger had Brood Drones, Brood-infected Space Sharks, and a Brood-infected human riding an Acanti into attacking Weapon H. After the Brood Drones and Brood-Space Sharks are slain and the Acanti is knocked out, the Brood-infected human states to Weapon H that Roxxon wants to hire him. Weapon H stated that those who claim to help people will kill them anyway and has the Brood-infected human carry a message to Roxxon to leave him alone.

Later a Brood Queen came to Earth to find the perfect host so she can initiate the process to become the new Brood Empress. Her attempts at targeting astronauts were thwarted by the discovery that J. Jonah Jameson is the perfect host but Frank Castle was able to interfere.

When the New Mutants returned from a space adventure with a mysterious egg which turned out to be extremely valuable to rival alien nation-states of the Kree and the Shi'ar, as well as the Brood, as shown by the Kree and Shi'ar fighting over its location and the Brood invading Earth to get it back. The X-Men beat them back while Broo and his colleagues studied the egg and learn that it actually was the King Egg, a superweapon developed by Kree scientists thousands of years before the modern Marvel Universe on the Kree capital world of Hala, to foster the Brood race and instill a patriarchal element that, when activated, could turn the entire Brood species into a controllable army. This would allow the Kree to set the deadly predators against rival intergalactic powers and consume them.

This leads every Brood Queen to send their swarms in pursuit of it, to prevent any loss of their power in the Brood hive-mind. The Brood initially attacked Earth, but a small team of X-Men including Cyclops, Jean Grey, Havok, Vulcan and Broo was able to get the King Egg off of Earth and lead the aliens off-planet. The Brood followed after them, with the X-Men eventually ending up alongside the Starjammers and members of the Shi'Ar Imperial Guard. After crash-landing on an abandoned planet, it initially looks like the assembled heroes are going to be overwhelmed and wiped out by the sheer magnitude of Brood attacking them. As the various factions of the Brood descended upon the X-Men in a massive battle, the Brood suddenly stopped in place. But just as the Brood surround them, to everyone's surprise, the Brood halt their attack when Broo eats the King Egg. This enhances Broo's biology, increasing his pheromone output to the point where even the Brood Queens become subservient of him. For all intents and purposes, eating the egg turned Broo into the Brood King.

Some time later, the X-Men got a distress call from deep space and find that the galaxy’s Brood problem is not as solved as they’d thought! When the X-Men’s close friend Broo became the Brood King, he gained the ability to control the savage alien race he was both a part of and so different from. Now he is experiencing his own nightmare scenario, the Brood are killing his friends, and there is nothing he can do to stop it! Rogue Brood factions have begun running wild. It was soon revealed that Nightmare is the force behind the recent Brood expansion, using his abilities to usurp control of the race whenever Broo is asleep, and he's doing this specifically to take revenge on the X-Men for Jean Grey's earlier victory over him, while the new Brood Empress, unhappy with the fact Broo had control of the Brood, used this oportunity so she and her army of Brood could break off on their own.

Known Brood
The following characters are either Brood and/or were turned into Brood:

 Assassin – A Brood that was spawned from an Assassin's Guild member.
 Blake – A servant of Roxxon Energy Corporation who was infected by the Brood parasite in order to help apprehend Weapon H. The Brood-infected human named Blake appeared in a cage with Roxxon's Man-Thing in a Roxxon facility until they were freed by Weapon H. After it was revealed that Roxxon had opened a portal to Weirdworld, Blake and Roxxon's Man-Thing took their leave as Dr. Ella Sterling suggests he seek out Doctor Strange to remove the Brood parasite from him. When the Skrullduggers emerge from the portal and start attacking the nearby humans, Blake and Man-Thing assist Weapon H into fighting the Skrullduggers until it was discovered that the Skrullduggers are shapeshifters. Blake and Man-Thing are sent to keep more Skrullduggers from emerging from the portal. When Weapon H and Dario later check up on them, it was discovered that they had some help in defeating the Skrullduggers from Korg. While commenting that he will need to come up with a codename, his condition to helping Dario deal with the Skrullduggers is $10,000,000.00 and being restored to normal. He even asked Man-Thing if he has a human form to which he doesn't get an answer to. As Weapon H leads the mission to Weirdworld, they are attacked by a tribe of blue-skinned humanoids called the Inaku who blame them for breaking the Earth and allowing the Skrullduggers to take their queen.
 Blindside – A Brood Mutant that can teleport. He was killed by Storm.
 Brickbat –  A Brood Mutant with super-strength. He was killed when Havok collapsed a building where a support beam impaled him.
 Broo – A Brood born a mutant when held in the Pandora's Box Space Station.
 Broodskrulls – A group of Brood and Skrull Hybrids.
 Buchanan Mitty – Former Entymologist turned Brood.
 Deadpal – A small Brood born from Deadpool's body after a failed transformation.
 Devros – A former Kree turned Brood.
 Dive-Bomber – A Brood Mutant that can fly with the wings on its back. He was killed by Havok.
 Dzilòs – A Brood killed by Wolverine.
 Empress Brood –
 Fang – An Imperial Guard turned Brood.
 Haeg'Rill – One of the Brood who allied with Deathbird.
 Hannah Conover – A known Brood Queen who is married to William Conover.
 Harry Palmer – A human paramedic-turned-Brood who is the leader of the Brood Mutants where he infected different Mutants. He was killed by Wolverine.
 Josey Thomas – A human paramedic-turned-Brood who is Harry Palmer's partner in the Brood Mutants. She is later killed by the Empress Brood.
 Kam'N'Ehar – One of the Brood who allied with Deathbird.
 Karl Lykos Brood clone –  A clone with mixture from both Sauron and Brood DNA, created by Kaga to join his army in order to annihilate the X-Men.
 Khasekhemwy Khasekhemui – A Pharaoh and ruler of Egypt's Upper and Lower Kingdoms during the Second Dynasty who was infected by the Brood. He and the Brood with him were killed by a coalition that were led by Imhotep.
 Krakoa Brood clone –  A clone with a mixture from both Krakoa and Brood DNA, created by Kaga to join his army in order to annihilate the X-Men.
 Lockup – A Brood Mutant with a paralyzing touch. He was killed when Havok collapsed a stage on him and Spitball.
 Nassis – A former Shi'ar student turned Brood.
 No-Name – A Brood Queen that is a member of the Warbound.
 Queen of the Brood – An unnamed Brood Queen who is a member of the Galactic Council.
 Skur'kll – One of the Brood who allied with Deathbird.
 Spitball – Robert Delgado was a lawyer from Denver whose mutant powers allow him to spit out hot plasma balls. He was among the mutants that were turned into Brood by Harry Palmer. During the fight with the X-Men, Spitball was killed when Havok collapsed a stage on him and Lockup.
 T'Crilēē – A hunt-master which contacted a Shi'ar vessel.
 Temptress – A Brood Mutant with pheromones that enable her to enslave anyone to her control. While having ensnared Psylocke and Rogue under her control, Temptress was killed by Wolverine.
 Tension – A Brood Mutant who can extend his arms to constrict anyone. After attacking Reverend William Conover, Tension was killed by Havok.
 Tuurgid – A former Frost Giant turned Brood.
 Whiphand – A Brood Mutant who can transform his arms into long bands of energy that can disrupt the neuro-functions of anyone. He was killed by Colossus who snapped his neck.
 Xzax – A Brood mercenary who is a member of Dracula's New Frightful Four. He was killed when Deadpool slammed him into a moving truck.
 Zen-Pram – A former Kree turned Brood.

Other versions

Age of Apocalypse
In the Age of Apocalypse timeline, without the X-Men to aid them, part of the Shi'ar Imperium was consumed by the Brood, who infected its populace with Brood implants, including the still-captive Christopher Summers. Escaping to Earth, Summers fought to control his Brood implant, but was captured by Mister Sinister. Sinister turned him over to the Dark Beast, who then proceeded to experiment on him for years. Summers eventually escaped, and began infecting other humans (Including the AoA version of Joseph "Robbie" Robertson, as well as friends of Misty Knight and Colleen Wing). Ultimately, Corsair transformed into a Brood Queen and attempted to kill Alex but was killed by his son Cyclops. The Summers brothers cremated their father and indirectly deprived Sinister of the chance to carry out further tests on Brood DNA.

Amalgam Comics
In Amalgam Comics, the Brood is combined with Brother Blood to form Brother Brood, and with the Cult of Blood to form the Cult of Brood. The Brood appear alongside Brother Brood, but are presented as supernatural rather than extraterrestrial.

Bishop's timeline
According to the time-traveling X-Man Bishop there are benign factions of Brood in the future. It is speculated that these "good" Brood are originated from Hannah Connover.

JLA/Avengers
In JLA/Avengers, the Brood have a brief cameo scene, where they are seen attacking Mongul and apparently invading Warworld as the two universes begin to come together.

WildC.A.T.s/X-Men
In WildC.A.T.s/X-Men: The Silver Age, alien hybrids of the Brood and Daemonites are created by Mister Sinister.

Ultimate Marvel
In the Ultimate Marvel universe, the Brood appeared as a Danger Room training exercise during the Tempest arc of Ultimate X-Men. The Brood are later revealed to be creatures native to the mindscape, where the Shadow King dwells.

X-Men: The End
In X-Men: The End, taking place in a possible future, the Brood hatch a plan with Lilandra (possessed by Cassandra Nova). Nova plans to solidify her rule over Shi'ar space by smuggling an other-dimensional pure-Brood queen from an alternate universe. This realm is one where the X-Men failed to ever fight the Brood, they are described as 'pure'. This Brood Queen is implanted in Lilandra's sister, Deathbird.

Marvel 2099
During the attack of insanity brought by Psiclone, the androgynous harlot Cash imagined the Brood between the races of extraterrestrials who swarmed the streets of Transverse City.

X-Men '92
In the comic book series of X-Men '92, which is set in the X-Men animated series' universe, a cadre of Mutant Brood called X-Brood (composed of Hardside, Fastskin, Phader, Sharpwing and Openmind) were tracked down by the Shi'ar, until they were saved by the X-Men.

Earth X
In Earth X, while telling to Isaac Christians of the Dire Wraiths exiled by the Spaceknights in Limbo, Kyle Richmond mentions the Brood, when wondering why the invasion attempts were always done by shapeshifting races as the Skrulls, the Impossible Men or the Brood.

Marvel Zombies: Resurrection
In Marvel Zombies: Resurrection, the infection that has transformed most of Earth's heroes into zombie-like beings is revealed to be the result of a Brood infesting Galactus, which allowed the Brood to achieve a new state of being and expand their resources even further.

Heroes Reborn (2021)
In the 2021 "Heroes Reborn" comic, the Brood were responsible for infecting the Imperial Guard who were allied with Hyperion.

In other media

Television
 A heavily altered version called The Colony appears in the X-Men animated series. These aliens looked more reptilian than insectoid and were equipped with metallic tentacled armors instead of having organic tentacles. In addition, instead of laying their eggs in other people, they infect other races and transform them into their own kind. In the episode "Love in Vain", they attempted to capture and infect the X-Men to expand their race, but mainly targeted Rogue so they could turn her into their next queen. However, their attempts were foiled by the Wolverine, due to his regenerative powers making him immune to the infection, and Professor X, who used his telepathy to free the Acanti, an extraterrestrial being that was forced to serve as the colony's ship. The classic Brood appear in the episode "Mojovision", as generic aliens that fight Beast and Rogue in one of Mojo's shows as well as the Japanese intro for the X-Men Series. A classic Brood Queen also appears in the episode "Cold Comfort" as an illusion projected by Professor X to scare away the soldiers attacking Iceman.
 The Brood are also briefly mentioned in the anime series Marvel Anime: X-Men. In the eighth episode, the X-Men battle mutant monsters and Wolverine mistakes them for being the Brood by asking "Have the Brood landed again"?
 The Brood appear in the Avengers Assemble; animated series where some of them were seen watching "Mojo-Pocalypse".
 A member of the Brood appears in the M.O.D.O.K. animated series after the titular character attempts to summon them, only to discover they had been slain by the Ciegrimites.

Video games
 Brood appears as a card in Marvel Snap.
 The title of one of the tracks in X-Men 2: Clone Wars is "The Brood Queen & Her Claws", and the Phalanx are enemies in the later levels.
 A Brood Queen is a boss in the first X-Men game for the Sega Game Gear.
 The Brood and the Brood Queen are enemy characters in the Super NES game X-Men: Mutant Apocalypse.
 In X-Men Legends II: Rise of Apocalypse, the Cerci are a race of insect enemies which are based on the Brood from the comics. They are referred to as such in the game's viewable concept art, and one type of Cerci is called a "Brood Queen". However, while the Brood are highly intelligent aliens, the Cerci are genetically engineered creatures with animal-like intelligence. As you fight the Cerci, some have a name with "Brood" in the title as well. The Broods plays an important antagonistic role in the PSP extra mission, such as kidnapping Lilandra Neramani and Carol Danvers, and massacring most of the mutants (particularly the Morlocks)
 The Brood appear as enemies in Marvel Heroes.
 In Lego Marvel Super Heroes, the Brood are mentioned on the S.H.I.E.L.D. Helicarrier's intercom where it's possible that their eggs were in the tapioca pudding.

Collectibles
 One of the Marvel Milestone statues features Marc Silvestri's Brood-infected Wolverine cover for Uncanny X-Men #234.
 Brood Queen is one of the "build a figure" toys in the Marvel Legends series.
 Broodling toys have been produced by Toy Biz (winged, for their X-Men line) and Marvel Select Toys (unwinged and based on Fang's transformation, in a two pack with a Skrull warrior).

See also
 Alien
 Brother Brood
 Bugs
 Tyranids
 Zerg

References

External links
 The Brood at Marvel.com
 The Brood at UncannyXmen.net
 
 Brood at Comic Vine
 Brood at Comic Book DB

Marvel Comics characters who are shapeshifters
Fictional parasites and parasitoids
Hive minds in fiction
Characters created by Chris Claremont
Characters created by Dave Cockrum
X-Men supporting characters